Jonesport is a census-designated place (CDP) comprising the villages of Jonesport and West Jonesport in the town of Jonesport, Washington County, Maine, United States. It is in southern Washington County, on the north shore of Moosabec Reach, a tidal channel separating the mainland from Beals Island. The town of Beals is to the south across the channel, connected to Jonesport by a road bridge.

Maine State Route 187 is Jonesport's Main Street. The highway leads northwest  to U.S. Route 1 near Columbia Falls and northeast the same distance to Route 1 near Jonesboro.

Jonesport was first listed as a CDP prior to the 2020 census.

Demographics

References 

Census-designated places in Washington County, Maine
Census-designated places in Maine